King of Clubs is a 2007 golf video game developed by Oxygen Studios and published by Oxygen Interactive. It was released for the Wii, PlayStation 2, PlayStation Portable, and Windows. It received "generally unfavorable reviews" according to Metacritic.

Gameplay
King of Clubs involves a rich Elvis Presley-like man named "Big Bubba" who opens a themed crazy golf course. The game features 96 holes set in 5 different environment themes. Each environment theme has its own resident "Course Pro" in suitably themed fancy dress costume. In addition, players are able to unlock and use various clubs and balls.

Reception

King of Clubs received "generally unfavorable reviews" according to Metacritic.

References

External links
 King of Clubs at MobyGames

2007 video games
Golf video games
PlayStation 2 games
PlayStation Network games
PlayStation Portable games
Wii games
Windows games
Video games developed in the United Kingdom
Oxygen Games games
Multiplayer and single-player video games